The women's triple jump at the 2011 Asian Athletics Championships was held at the Kobe Universiade Memorial Stadium on 9 July.

Results

References
Results

2011 Asian Athletics Championships
Triple jump at the Asian Athletics Championships
2011 in women's athletics